Positive is a 2007 Hindi short film directed by Farhan Akhtar and produced by Farhan Akhtar and Ritesh Sidhwani under their Excel Entertainment Pvt. Ltd. banner. The film starred Shabana Azmi and Boman Irani in leads roles.

Overview
Positive was a part of AIDS JaaGo (AIDS Awake), a series of four short films, directed by Mira Nair (Migration), Santosh Sivan (Prarambha), Vishal Bhardwaj (Blood Brothers) and Farhan Akhtar, in a joint initiative of Mira Nair's Mirabai Films, voluntary organisations Avahan and Bill & Melinda Gates Foundation. The film stars Boman Irani, Shabana Azmi and a debutant actor, Arjun Mathur.

Boman Irani plays an AIDS patient, Shabana Azmi as his wife and Arjun Mathur as their son.

The movie premiered at the Toronto International Film Festival in 2007.

Plot
Years ago, when Abhijit was a boy, he learned his father was involved in extramarital relationships. He kept it secret for several years, until tension rose too high and he left for Cape Town.

Time passes and Abhijit is called by his mother. His father had contracted the AIDS virus. It was up to Abhijit to be the bigger person to comfort his father, even after all he had done, in his last moments of life.

Cast
 Shabana Azmi - Mrs. Soni
 Boman Irani - Mr. Soni
 Arjun Mathur - Abhijit Soni
 Krish Chawla - Young Abhijit Soni

References

External links
 Watch "Positive" on YouTube
 
 Farhan Akhtar Talks of Positive

2000s Hindi-language films
2007 films
Indian short films
HIV/AIDS in Indian films
Films directed by Farhan Akhtar